Nawab Muzaffar-Jang Diler Himmat Khan (1771-1796) was the fourth nawab or ruler of Farrukhabad, a kingdom in India. He succeeded his father Ahmad Khan Bangash as the ruler in 1771.

Early life and background
Diler Himmat Khan was born to Nawab Ahmad Khan Bangash and his fourth wife, Khair-un-nissa in September 1757 - September 1758. His father was a leading noble in the Mughal Empire and ruled Farrukhabad as his ancestral domain. Diler Himmat Khan's mother, Khair-un-nissa was the adopted daughter of Yakut Khan, one of Ahmad Khan's salves and reportedly a descendant of Khan Jahan Khan Lodi, the  principal Afghan noble during the reign of Mughal emperor Shah Jahan. 
Diler's birth was much rejoiced at and he was given the title of Muzaffar Jang by his father.

Reign
On his father's death in 1771, Diler Himmat Khan succeeded him as the Nawab of Farrukhabad. His father, Ahmad Khan Bangash, had spent a large portion of his reign fighting against the Maratha Empire. Thus, he allied with the ruler of Awadh, Shuja-ud-Daula in 1773 to expel the Marathas. However, he became a tributary of Awadh in 1774 after the First Rohilla War. The British Governor-General of India, Lord Cornwallis considered Muzaffar Jang to be "either a madman or an idiot". Muzaffar Jang died on the 22nd of October 1796, alllegedly poisoned by his eldest son Rustam Ali Khan.

References

 People from Farrukhabad
 Nawabs of India
 Mughal Empire
 1796 deaths